Leilaptera is a moth genus in the family Autostichidae. It contains the species Leilaptera lithochroma, which is found in Algeria.

The wingspan is 10–11 mm. The forewings are uniform pale stone-ochreous, a few scattered brown scales towards the apex and a minute spot of darker brown at the lower angle of the cell. The hindwings are pale grey.

References

Symmocinae